California's 12th congressional district special election, 2008 occurred on April 8, 2008. California's 12th congressional district was vacated following the death of Democrat Tom Lantos on February 11, 2008. The special election was called by Governor Arnold Schwarzenegger to fill the vacancy for the remainder of Lantos's term ending on January 3, 2009.
The special election took the form of an open primary. Another election would have taken place on June 3 had no candidate received a majority.

Democrat Jackie Speier won a majority of the votes in the open primary and therefore won the election.

Candidates 
The following individuals appeared in the certified list of candidates and the certified list of write-in candidates published by the California Secretary of State, and were thus eligible to receive votes in the special primary election.

Green
Barry Hermanson, an equity lawyer

Democratic
Michelle T. McMurry, a health policy director
Jackie Speier, a former State Senator who was endorsed by Lantos as his successor

Libertarian
Kevin Peterson, a write-in candidate

Republican
Robert "Rock" Brickell-Viagra, a write-in candidate
Greg Conlon, a businessman and former member of the California Public Utilities Commission, who favored deregulation.
Mike Moloney, a retired businessman who ran for the seat in 2002 and 2006

Results

References

External links 

 Greg Conlon's campaign
 Barry Hermanson's campaign
 Michelle McMurry's campaign
 Mike Moloney's campaign
 Jackie Speier's campaign

California 2008 12
California 2008 12
2008 12 Special
California 12 Special
United States House of Representatives 12 Special
United States House of Representatives 2008 12